Woollahra Municipal Council (or Woollahra Council) is a local government area in the eastern suburbs of Sydney, in the state of New South Wales, Australia. Woollahra is bounded by Sydney Harbour in the north, Waverley Council in the east, Randwick City in the south and the City of Sydney in the west.

The administrative centre of Woollahra Municipal Council is located in Double Bay. The Mayor of Woollahra Municipal Council is Cr. Susan Wynne.

Suburbs in the local government area 
Suburbs in the area include:

Demographics
At the 2011 Census, there were  people in the Woollahra local government area, of these 47.1% were male and 52.9% were female. Aboriginal and Torres Strait Islander people made up 0.2% of the population. The median age of people in the Municipality of Woollahra was 38 years. Children aged 0 – 14 years made up 15.4% of the population and people aged 65 years and over made up 16.3% of the population. Of people in the area aged 15 years and over, 43.1% were married and 10.3% were either divorced or separated.

Population growth in the Municipality of Woollahra between the 2001 Census and the 2006 Census was 0.70%; and in the subsequent five years to the 2011 Census, population growth was 3.98%. When compared with total population growth of Australia for the same periods, being 5.78% and 8.32% respectively, population growth in Woollahra local government area was significantly lower than the national average. The median weekly income for residents within the Municipality of Woollahra was double the national average.

At the 2016 Census, the proportion of residents who stated a religious affiliation with Judaism was in excess of thirtytwo times the state and national averages.

Woollahra Municipal Council

Current composition and election method
Woollahra Municipal Council is composed of fifteen Councillors elected proportionally as five separate wards, each electing three Councillors. Councillors are usually elected for a fixed four-year term of office. The Mayor is elected by the Councillors at the first meeting of the council. The Council election of 4 December 2021 resulted in the following makeup:

The council as elected in 2021, in order of election by ward, was:

History of Woollahra 

The name 'Woollahra' is thought to be derived from an Aboriginal word meaning 'camp' or 'meeting ground'.

A petition was submitted in 1859 with 144 signatures of local residents from Darling Point, Paddington and Watsons Bay for the formation of the Municipality. With no petition against formation of the Municipality, Woollahra was proclaimed to be named so on 17 April 1860, and gazetted on 20 April 1860. At the first meeting, The Hon. George Thornton was elected as the first Chairman of Woollahra.

In 1947, after previously acquiring 'Iron House' on Ocean Street, in the 1860s, Council transferred to the current site at Redleaf.

Woollahra largely developed as a residential locality. A few small local industries were established in Woollahra, Double Bay and Paddington; but with the residential gentrification of Paddington and Woollahra in the 1960s, most of these cottage industries had vanished by the end of the 20th century.

Woollahra's cultural heritage has been enriched by the influx of people from many different cultural backgrounds. Some of the influential immigrants to Woollahra have been the Chinese market gardeners, who began leasing land in Double Bay gully and Rose Bay in the 1880s; the Portuguese whalers who settled at Watsons Bay in the 19th century, building a church and becoming a part of the village life, and the many Europeans who migrated after World War II and helped change the face of commercial centres such as Double Bay.

Following an independent review, in May 2016 the NSW Government sought to dismiss the council and force its amalgamation with Waverley and Randwick councils. Woollahra Council instigated legal action claiming that there was procedural unfairness and that a KPMG report at the centre of merger proposals had been "misleading". The matter was heard before the NSW Court of Appeal who, in December 2016, unanimously dismissed the council's appeal, finding no merit in its arguments that the proposed merger with its neighbouring councils was invalid. In July 2017, the Berejiklian government decided to abandon the forced merger of the Woollahra, Waverley and Randwick local government areas, along with several other proposed forced mergers.

Heritage listings 
The Municipality of Woollahra has a number of heritage-listed sites, including:

 Bellevue Hill, 24 Victoria Road: Leura
 Darling Point, 1a Carthona Avenue: Lindesay
 Darling Point, 68 Darling Point Road: The Swifts
 Darling Point, 103 Darling Point Road: Babworth House
 Darling Point, 11-21 Greenoaks Avenue: Bishopscourt
 Double Bay, Cross Street: Double Bay Compressed Air Ejector Station
 Double Bay, 11 Gladswood Gardens: Gladswood House
 Double Bay, 337-347 New South Head Road: Overthorpe
 Double Bay, 560 New South Head Road: Fairwater
 Double Bay, 4 and 6 Wiston Gardens: Houses
 Edgecliff, 8 Albert Street: Fenton and surrounds
 Paddington, 1 Ormond Street: Juniper Hall, Paddington
 Paddington, 56a Ormond Street: Engehurst
 Paddington, 246 Oxford Street: Paddington Post Office
 Paddington, 1 Young Street: Paddington Substation
 Point Piper, 10 Dunara Gardens: Dunara
 Rose Bay, 3-4 Fernleigh Gardens: Site of Ficus superba var. henneana tree
 Rose Bay, 1-7 Salisbury Road: Salisbury Court (Rose Bay)
 Vaucluse, 32b Fitzwilliam Road: Wentworth Memorial Church
 Vaucluse, Chapel Road: Wentworth Mausoleum
 Vaucluse, Greycliffe Avenue: Nielsen Park
 Vaucluse, Old South Head Road: Macquarie Lighthouse
 Vaucluse, 52 Vaucluse Road: Strickland House, Vaucluse
 Vaucluse, 69a Wentworth Road: Vaucluse House
 Watsons Bay, Dunbar (ship)
 Watsons Bay, Old South Head Road: Hornby Lighthouse
 Woollahra, 14 Rosemont Avenue: Rosemont
 Woollahra, Waimea Avenue: Waimea House

See also

 Local government areas of New South Wales

References

External links 
 Woollahra Municipal Council website

 
Woollahra
1860 establishments in Australia